Marzəsə (also, Marzasay) is a village and municipality in the Astara Rayon of Azerbaijan.  It has a population of 449.  The municipality consists of the villages of Marzəsə, Bili, Bio, and Sıhəkəran.

References 

Populated places in Astara District